A Woman as a Friend is a 2014 romantic comedy film written and directed  by Giovanni Veronesi and starring Fabio De Luigi and Laetitia Casta.

Plot

Cast 

Fabio De Luigi as Francesco
Laetitia Casta as  Claudia
Valentina Lodovini as  Lia 
Valeria Solarino as  Anna 
Adriano Giannini as  Giovanni
Monica Scattini as  Elga
 Geppi Cucciari as  Cecilia
 Virginia Raffaele as Patrizia
Antonia Liskova as  Antonia
 Flavio Montrucchio as  Luca

See also 
 List of Italian films of 2014

References

External links 

2014 films
2014 romantic comedy films
Italian romantic comedy films
Films directed by Giovanni Veronesi
2010s Italian-language films
2010s Italian films